Santa Fe Depot, also known as the Santa Fe Transit Hub, is a historic train station located in downtown Oklahoma City, Oklahoma. Amtrak's Heartland Flyer makes daily round-trip service from Oklahoma City to Fort Worth, Texas. The station is the designated Intermodal Transit Hub for the region and as of 2016 is under renovation to accommodate this enhanced use.

History

The current depot is the third one to be located at its current site. The first station was built in 1889, soon after the founding of the city. It was demolished to make way for the second station, which was built in 1904 and then demolished in 1930 when the current depot was built in its place.

The station was built in 1934 by the Atchison, Topeka and Santa Fe Railway. It is an Art Deco structure located in downtown Oklahoma City at 100 South E.K. Gaylord Boulevard. It was served by the Santa Fe Railway's Texas Chief line, which later became the Lone Star under Amtrak. The station was also served by the Santa Fe's Kansas Cityan/Chicagoan.

Amtrak discontinued the service in 1979 when it terminated the Lone Star. Subsequently, the station was vacant for 20 years and began to deteriorate.

Other stations in Oklahoma City were the Union Station on SW 7th Street, which served the St. Louis–San Francisco Railway (Frisco Railway) and the Chicago, Rock Island and Pacific Railroad (Rock Island Railroad); and the Missouri Kansas Texas Station on East Reno Street, which served the Missouri–Kansas–Texas Railroad.

In 1998, Jim Brewer, a developer responsible for creating the nearby Bricktown entertainment district, purchased the station from Santa Fe Railway and oversaw a renovation using $2 million funds provided through the Oklahoma Department of Transportation (ODOT) to make it accessible to people with disabilities and usable as a train station. In 1998, Amtrak and the state reached an informal agreement with Brewer Entertainment to use the station rent-free as the northern terminus of the new Heartland Flyer line, connecting to Fort Worth. The agreement required the state to pay for utilities and other costs associated with station operations.

Service began in 1999, reconnecting Oklahoma to the national rail network. Another $3.1 million renovation was completed in 2007, and additional accessibility features were added with a $30,000 project funded by the American Recovery and Reinvestment Act of 2009.

No official lease had been drawn up until at least 2010, when Brent Brewer locked the doors of the depot on September 27 and 29, forcing new negotiations with ODOT. On December 21, 2010, it was announced that the ODOT had signed a lease of the station and parking lot for 25 months, with the option to extend the lease for up to ten years.

The station was listed on the National Register of Historic Places in 2015.

Oklahoma City Streetcar service commenced at the station with that system's opening on December 14, 2018.

Station services
 Station Hours (daily 08:00-10:00 am, 9:40-11:40 pm)
 Enclosed Waiting Area
 Restrooms during station hours
 ATM

Function
The City of Oklahoma City has designated the Santa Fe station as the location for intermodal transit services for the city and metropolitan area. The station will continue to serve as the primary Amtrak station for the region, but other services will be offered including Oklahoma City Streetcar, EMBARK commuter bus, future commuter rail to the suburbs of Midwest City, Del City, Edmond, Moore, and Norman, along with proposed Eastern Flyer passenger rail (to Tulsa), possible high-speed rail, potential light rail, parking, and the possible return of inter-city bus lines. In 2015, the Santa Fe Intermodal hub was under refurbishment for the first phase of operations. Funding was made as part of the city's Metropolitan Area Projects MAPS and a TIGER grant from the United States Department of Transportation.

References

External links

PassengerRailOk.org
Heartland Flyer
Oklahoma City Amtrak Station (USA Rail Guide -- Train Web)

Amtrak stations in Oklahoma
Transit centers in the United States
Oklahoma City
Buildings and structures in Oklahoma City
Transportation in Oklahoma City
Economy of Oklahoma City
Railway stations in Oklahoma
Railway stations in the United States opened in 1934
Art Deco architecture in Oklahoma
Railway stations on the National Register of Historic Places in Oklahoma
National Register of Historic Places in Oklahoma City